The Lorenz rifle was an Austrian rifle used in the mid 19th century. It was used in the Second Italian War of Independence in 1859 and the Austro-Prussian War in 1866, and also featured prominently in the American Civil War.

History
The Lorenz rifle was designed by Austrian lieutenant Joseph Lorenz. It was first approved for manufacture in 1854, and was Austria's first all-new infantry firearm since 1842. The demand for the rifles was much greater than what the Austrian state arsenals could produce, so much of the production was done by private manufacturers. Many of these manufacturers did not have the skill and precision required to make what was then a very modern and sophisticated rifle design, and as a result, the quality of Lorenz rifles varied quite a bit. The bore diameters also varied quite a bit due to insufficient control of allowable tolerances. This often left too much of a gap between the bullet and the barrel, resulting in poor performance.

Replacing the earlier Augustin musket, the Lorenz was first distributed to Austrian soldiers in 1855. Despite its superiority to the Augustin, the Lorenz suffered from slow delivery and was sometimes used ineffectively due to prevailing conservatism in tactics and training. By 1859, the year of the Austro-Sardinian War, not all Austrian units had received the new rifle.

Design features
The Lorenz rifle was a percussion-type muzzleloader, and as such was similar in design to the British Pattern 1853 Enfield and the American Springfield Model 1861 rifle-muskets. It had a  barrel which was held into place by three barrel bands. The barrel was .5473 caliber, which was slightly smaller than the .577 used by the Enfield and the .58 standardized in later Springfields.

The stock was made of beech or occasionally walnut. The Lorenz could have either block or leaf-sights.

The rifle was fitted with a quadrangle socket bayonet.

Use
The Lorenz rifle first saw action in the Second Italian War of Independence. It was later used in the Balkans. The original Model 1854 Lorenz rifle was replaced in the Austrian army by an improved Model 1862 variant. This later variant was the main Austrian weapon during the Austro-Prussian War, where the Prussian Dreyse needle gun generally outclassed them. After the war, the Austro-Hungarian Empire converted some 70,000 Lorenz rifles into the Wänzl breechloader until they had enough M1867 Werndl-Holub rifles to arm the military.

The Prussians, who had large numbers of captured Lorenz rifles, converted about 35,599 rifles into Zündnadel-Defensionsgewehr Ö/M (M1854/II System Lorenz) and issued them to Landwehr units in the Franco-Prussian War.

In the late 19th century surplus Lorenz rifles were sold in Africa as trade guns.

American Civil War
The Lorenz rifle was the third most widely used rifle during the American Civil War. The Union recorded purchases of 226,924 and the Confederacy bought as many as 100,000. Confederate-bought Lorenz rifles saw heavy use in the Army of Mississippi in 1863–64, with many of them being issued to re-equip regiments captured at the siege of Vicksburg and later exchanged. On the Union side, continental European firearms were mostly distributed to the Western armies—as such, the Lorenz Rifle was relatively uncommon in the Army of the Potomac (although two regiments of the famous Iron Brigade carried them) but heavily used by the Army of the Cumberland and Army of the Tennessee.

The quality of Lorenz rifles during the Civil War was not consistent. Some were considered to be of the finest quality (particularly ones from the Vienna Arsenal), and were sometimes praised as being superior to the Enfield; others, especially those in later purchases from private contractors, were described as horrible in both design and condition. Many of these poorer-quality weapons were swapped out on the battlefield for the British Enfield or the American Springfield rifle-muskets whenever these were available. A fair number of Lorenz rifles had also been used in the 1859 conflict with France and were worn and not in pristine condition when they reached the United States.

Lorenz rifles in the Civil War were generally used with .54 caliber cartridges designed for the Model 1841 "Mississippi" rifle. These differed from the cartridges manufactured in Austria and may have contributed to the unreliability of the weapons. Many of the rifles were bored out to .58 caliber to accommodate standard Springfield rifle ammunition, which also created problems as the Lorenz was designed to fire a solid base bullet instead of the hollow base Minie ball. The sights on the gun also were not measured in the English measuring units used in the United States but a different German measurement system—as such, this made it difficult for soldiers to aim and fire them accurately. Improper cleaning of the rifles also may have contributed to problems. Although Austrian army manuals described proper usage and maintenance of Lorenz rifles, none of them were translated into English.

Variants

The Lorenz rifle was produced in three different variants, designed for short, medium, and long range combat. The short range version, which was the most common, had less of a twist in the rifling and lacked long range sights. The medium range version had more of a twist in the rifling to increase long range accuracy and had movable long range sights. The long range version had an even greater twist in the rifling as well as a finer adjustable sight. This long-range version was intended only for use by elite fighting units.

The rifle was also produced in two different patterns, the 1854 and the 1862. The Pattern 1862 had a different type of lock plate that more closely resembled that used on the Enfield. Pattern 1862 rifles were also more consistent in their manufacturing.

A large number of Lorenz rifles purchased by the Union during the Civil War had their barrels bored to .58 caliber so that they could fire the same ammunition as the Enfield and Springfield rifle-muskets. The boring on these rifles suffered from the same lack of consistency that was found in the original manufacturer of the rifles. Confederate purchased rifles were kept in .54 caliber.

The finish on the rifles varied. Some were blued, some browned, and others were polished bright.

Users
Austrian Empire
Bolivia
Confederate States
France
Redshirts (Italy)
Second Mexican Empire
Principality of Montenegro
Peru
Polish-Lithuanian-Ruthenian Commonwealth (January Uprising)
Kingdom of Saxony
United States

Conflicts
Occupation of Danubian Principalities 1855-1857
Second Italian War of Independence 1859
Expedition of the Thousand 1860-1861
Brigandage in southern Italy 1861-1870
American Civil War 1861-1865
Montenegrin–Ottoman War 1861–62
January Uprising 1863-1864
Second Schleswig War 1864
Second French intervention in Mexico 1861-1867 (Austrian Voluntary Corps December 1864 – 1866)
Austro-Prussian War 1866
Third Italian War of Independence 1866
Franco-Prussian War 1870-1871
War of the Pacific 1879-1883

See also
 Weapons of the Austro-Hungarian Empire
 Rifles in the American Civil War

References 

Rifled muskets
American Civil War rifles
Weapons of the Confederate States of America
Rifles of Austria